Anthericonia is a monotypic genus of stick insect of the Pseudophasmatidae family. Its only species is Anthericonia anketeschke, which is found in Costa Rica.

References 

Phasmatodea
Phasmatodea genera
Monotypic insect genera
Insects of Central America
Insects described in 2004